Gosforth School may refer to various schools in Gosforth, Newcastle upon Tyne, England:
Gosforth Academy, formerly Gosforth High School
Gosforth Junior High Academy, formerly Gosforth West Middle School
Gosforth East Middle School

For a list of Schools in Gosforth see Education in Gosforth